Richard Lowe Johnson (September 21, 1917 - November 9, 2002) is best known for being chief test pilot for Convair, a division of the American defence contractor General Dynamics, and as a founding member of the Society of Experimental Test Pilots in 1955.

Biography
Johnson was born in Cooperstown, North Dakota, and educated at Oregon State University. In 1942, Johnson enlisted in the US Army Air Corps and served as a P-47 Thunderbolt pilot with the 57th Group's, 66th Fighter Squadron, in North Africa and Italy. He completed 180 combat missions and was awarded the Silver Star, the Legion of Merit, four Distinguished Flying Crosses and fourteen Air Medals. Johnson graduated from the Air Materiel Command Engineering Test Pilot School in 1946. The F-86A set its first official world speed record of 671 miles per hour (1,080 km/h) on September 15, 1948, at Muroc Dry Lake flown by Major Richard L. Johnson, USAF. Johnson remained in the US Air Force until 1953, having reached the rank of lieutenant colonel.

He died of brain cancer on November 9, 2002, and was buried with full military honors at Arlington National Cemetery.

Decorations
   Silver Star
   Legion of Merit
   Distinguished Flying Cross with 3 oak leaf clusters
   Air Medal with 13 oak leaf clusters

Other awards
Ivan C. Kincheloe Award in 1967, for the General Dynamics F-111 test program.

References

External links

Code One Magazine - obituary
The Society of Experimental Test Pilots - history
Biography

American aviators
United States Air Force officers
Recipients of the Silver Star
Recipients of the Legion of Merit
Recipients of the Distinguished Flying Cross (United States)
1917 births
2002 deaths
People from Griggs County, North Dakota
Oregon State University alumni
Deaths from brain cancer in the United States
Burials at Arlington National Cemetery
Recipients of the Air Medal
American test pilots
United States Army Air Forces pilots of World War II
United States Army Air Forces officers
American aviation record holders
Neurological disease deaths in the United States
U.S. Air Force Test Pilot School alumni